Waynetown is a town in Wayne Township, Montgomery County, in the U.S. state of Indiana. The population was 958 at the 2010 census.

History
Waynetown was platted, as "Middletown", by Samuel Mann in 1830.

Geography
Waynetown is located at  (40.087559, -87.065562).

Demographics

2010 census
As of the census of 2010, there were 1007 people, 391 households, and 282 families living in the town. The racial makeup of the town was 98.3% White, 0.2% African American, 0.4% from other races, and 1.0% from two or more races. Hispanic or Latino of any race were 2.0% of the population.

There were 391 households, of which 36.8% had children under the age of 18 living with them, 54.0% were married couples living together, 12.0% had a female householder with no husband present, 6.1% had a male householder with no wife present, and 27.9% were non-families. 24.8% of all households were made up of individuals, and 9.5% had someone living alone who was 65 years of age or older. The average household size was 2.45 and the average family size was 2.88.

The median age in the town was 37.1 years. 26.6% of residents were under the age of 18; 8.4% were between the ages of 18 and 24; 24.4% were from 25 to 44; 25.2% were from 45 to 64; and 15.4% were 65 years of age or older. The gender makeup of the town was 48.4% male and 51.6% female.

2000 census
As of the census of 2000, there were 909 people, 372 households, and 265 families living in the town. The racial makeup of the town was 99.34% White, 0.11% African American, and 0.55% from two or more races. Hispanic or Latino of any race were 0.44% of the population.

There were 372 households, out of which 32.3% had children under the age of 18 living with them, 56.2% were married couples living together, 9.9% had a female householder with no husband present, and 28.5% were non-families. 25.8% of all households were made up of individuals, and 16.7% had someone living alone who was 65 years of age or older. The average household size was 2.44 and the average family size was 2.91.

In the town, the population was spread out, with 27.3% under the age of 18, 6.6% from 18 to 24, 29.2% from 25 to 44, 21.3% from 45 to 64, and 15.6% who were 65 years of age or older. The median age was 35 years. For every 100 females, there were 94.6 males. For every 100 females age 18 and over, there were 91.6 males.

The median income for a household in the town was $37,188, and the median income for a family was $44,191. Males had a median income of $35,313 versus $21,287 for females. The per capita income for the town was $16,328. About 5.9% of families and 8.6% of the population were below the poverty line, including 6.9% of those under age 18 and 13.1% of those age 65 or over.

Government
Waynetown has an elected five-member council which oversees many of the town functions, from grants through utilities, to park and recreation. The town also employs a police department which is made up of numerous deputies and a town marshal. Waynetown has its own utility department, which runs the town utilities and takes care of cleanup throughout the town. The town has two local associations who help oversee the town activities.

Local festivities
Each year the town of Waynetown holds a "Fish Fry" which also runs a carnival. The Fish Fry brings in many across the county, as well as from surrounding counties such as Fountain, Tippecanoe, and Parke.

Connection to Lewis & Clark Expedition
William Bratton (1778-1841), a member of the Lewis and Clark Expedition, settled in the Waynetown area in 1822 and "held various local county and township offices, including Justice of the Peace." He is buried in Old Pioneer Cemetery within Waynetown.

Education
North Montgomery School Corporation serves Waynetown. Elementary students are zoned to Sommer Elementary School. Secondary school students attend Northridge Middle School and North Montgomery High School.

Gallery

References

Towns in Indiana
Towns in Montgomery County, Indiana
1830 establishments in Indiana